İlemin  is a  village in Erdemli district of Mersin Province, Turkey. The population of İlemin is 683 as of 2012.

References

Villages in Erdemli District